Opogona sacchari, the banana moth, is a moth of the family Tineidae. The species was first described by Wenceslas Bojer in 1856. It is native to the humid tropical and subtropical regions of sub-Saharan Africa, where it is also found in Madagascar, Mauritius, Réunion, Rodrigues Island, the Seychelles and St. Helena. It was first reported from the Canary Islands in the 1920s. In the 1970s, it was introduced into Brazil and Central America, and also appeared in Europe. It has been reported from Florida since 1986.

The wingspan is 18–25 mm. Adults are bright yellowish brown. The forewings may show longitudinal darker brown banding, and in the male a dark-brown spot towards the apex. The hindwings are paler and brighter.

The larvae feed on a wide range of plants, including bananas, pineapples, bamboo, maize and sugarcane. In glasshouses in European countries, it has been found infesting various tropical or subtropical ornamentals, including Cactaceae, Dracaena, Strelitzia and Yucca, but also occasionally Alpinia, Begonia, Bougainvillea, Bromeliaceae, Chamaedorea and other palms, Cordyline, Dieffenbachia, Euphorbia pulcherrima, Ficus, Gloxinia, Heliconia, Hippeastrum, Maranta, Philodendron, Sansevieria, Streptocarpus sect. Saintpaulia, Capsicum and aubergines. The larvae burrow in the plant tissue. It is dirty white and somewhat transparent and has a bright reddish-brown head with. It is about 21–26 mm long.

The pupae are shorter than 10 mm, brown and formed in a cocoon of 15 mm.

At 15 °C it has a life cycle of about three months: eggs hatch in 12 days, larval development 50 days, pupal stage 20 days and adult life 6 days.

References

External links
Images
Species info

Opogona
Moths of Madagascar
Moths of Japan
Moths of Europe
Moths of Mauritius
Moths of Seychelles
Moths of Réunion
Moths of Africa
Moths described in 1856
Taxa named by Wenceslas Bojer